Muhammad Shawez Khan is a Pakistani politician who remained vice-chairman HasanAbdal for consecutive four terms. Later was elected Tehsil Nazim, from 2001 to 2005 and was a Member of the Provincial Assembly of the Punjab, from May 2013 to May 2018 and was given the charge of Chairperson of standing committee on Ministry of Religious Affairs and Auqaf.

Early life and education
He was born on 5 March 1953.

He received matriculation level education from Government High School, Hassan Abdal in 1969.

Political career

He was elected Vice-Chairman Baldiya Hasan Abdal for the consecutive four terms. Later became Tehsil Nazim from 2001 to 2005. Became member

Provincial Assembly of the Punjab as a candidate of Pakistan Muslim League (Nawaz) from Constituency PP-17 (Attock-III) in 2013 Pakistani general election.

References

Living people
Punjab MPAs 2013–2018
1953 births
Pakistan Muslim League (N) politicians